Vigo railway station may refer to:
Vigo-Urzáiz railway station, station in Vigo, Spain
Vigo-Guixar railway station, station in Vigo, Spain
Vialia Vigo, a 2016 high speed railway station in Vigo, Spain, by architect Thom Mayne
Vigo railway station (England), former station in Tyne and Wear, England